Alfreð Finnbogason (born 1 February 1989) is an Icelandic professional footballer who plays as a forward for Danish Superliga club Lyngby Boldklub and the Iceland national team.

With Heerenveen, Alfreð was the Dutch Eredivisie's top scorer in the 2013–14 season with 29 goals, a tally topped only by Luis Suárez, Cristiano Ronaldo and Jonathan Soriano in Europe's top leagues that season.

Alfreð made his debut for the Iceland national team against the Faroe Islands in 2010. He has earned 63 caps to date, scoring 15 goals. He was part of their squad at UEFA Euro 2016 and the 2018 FIFA World Cup, where he became the first Icelander to score a goal in the FIFA World Cup.

Club career
Born in Grindavík, Alfreð played for Ungmennafélag Grindavíkur's youth teams while also spending two years of his childhood in the Scottish capital Edinburgh. Alfreð played for boys' club Hutchison Vale, and became a fan of Hibernian, while his father studied in the city.

Breiðablik

Alfreð joined Breiðablik in 2005, featuring in the club's highly successful youth team alongside future internationals and/or expatriates Gylfi Sigurðsson, Aron Jóhannsson, Jóhann Berg Guðmundsson, Elfar Freyr Helgason, Guðmundur Kristjánsson, Kristinn Steindórsson and Kristinn Jónsson.

He made his senior debut for Breiðablik in 2008. In the 2009 Úrvalsdeild season, he scored 13 goals in 18 league games for Breiðablik. At the end of the campaign, he was voted Young Player of the Year by his fellow players. Breiðablik also won their first title ever, the Icelandic Cup.

After the 2009 season, he had a trial with Tippeligaen side Viking and English Championship side Blackpool.

In 2010, Alfreð was joint league top goalscorer with 14 goals, and voted player of the year by fellow players as Breiðablik won their first league title and participated for the first time in the UEFA Europa League when they played against Scottish side Motherwell.

Lokeren
On 3 November 2010, Breiðablik confirmed that an offer for Alfreð from Belgian side Lokeren had been accepted. After completing a medical, Alfreð signed a two-and-a-half-year contract with the club on 20 November 2010.

Helsingborgs IF (loan)
On 6 March 2012, Alfreð joined Swedish champions Helsingborgs IF on a six-month loan deal, ending on 15 August 2012.

Alfreð scored one goal and made five assists in a 6–1 aggregate win against Polish champions Śląsk Wrocław in the 2012–13 UEFA Champions League Third qualifying round. At the end of the loan period, Alfreð was Helsingborg's top scorer of 2012 with 12 goals in 17 all competitions matches.

Heerenveen
On 16 August 2012, Alfreð signed a three-year contract with Dutch Eredivisie club Heerenveen. He made a promising start for his new club, scoring two goals in his home debut against top side Ajax in a 2–2 draw and later scoring all four goals away to third division side Kozakken Boys in the KNVB Cup. Alfreð ended the season as the third-highest goalscorer of the Eredivisie, scoring 24 of Heereveen's 50 league goals.

Real Sociedad
On 2 July 2014, Alfreð signed for Spanish La Liga club Real Sociedad for a €7.5 million transfer fee, rising to €10 million with add-ons. He made his debut for the club later that month, starting in a 2–0 home win against Aberdeen for the season's UEFA Europa League.

Olympiacos (loan)
Greek champions Olympiacos had previously tried to sign the 26-year-old Icelandic, but failed to reach an agreement with his former club, Heerenveen. Despite the rival interest of PAOK, on 26 July 2015, Olympiacos officially announced that they had signed him on loan from Real Sociedad. He scored his first goal in a friendly game against Beşiktaş on 9 August 2015. Alfreð scored his first competitive and the winning goal for Olympiacos against Arsenal on 29 September 2015, in their Champions League Group F clash, earning Olympiacos their first ever win on English soil, in a 3–2 win at Emirates Stadium.

On 5 December 2015, he scored his first goal with a penalty kick in the Super League in a 4–3 away win against Panthrakikos.

FC Augsburg
He was loaned to FC Augsburg on 1 February 2016. He made his debut as a substitute against Ingolstadt five days later in a 2–1 defeat. He scored his first goal in his third appearance on 28 February, helping Augsburg to a 2–2 draw with Borussia Mönchengladbach. He would go on to score seven goals in fourteen appearances, and the loan was made permanent on 1 July 2016. On 9 September 2017, he scored a hat-trick in a Bundesliga game against FC Köln, in which Augsburg won by 3–0. On 16 December 2017, he scored another hat-trick in a 3–3 draw against SC Freiburg.

Lyngby
On 1 September 2022, Finnbogason signed a one-year contract with recently promoted Danish Superliga club Lyngby. He made his debut three days later, coming off the bench in the 64th minute for Tochi Chukwuani in a 2–0 home loss to Randers.

International career
Alfreð earned 11 caps and scored five goals for Iceland at under-21 level. His first goal came on 8 September 2009 in a 2011 UEFA European Under-21 Football Championship Group 5 qualifier 6–2 win against Northern Ireland under-21s at The Showgrounds, Coleraine.

Alfreð won his first cap for the Iceland national team in 2010, coming on as a substitute in a friendly match against the Faroe Islands. Alfreð scored on his full debut for Iceland against Israel in a 3–2 loss at Bloomfield Stadium in Tel Aviv. As of 26 June 2018, Alfreð has 50 caps and 14 goals for the senior team.

He was selected for UEFA Euro 2016.

In May 2018 he was named in Iceland's 23-man squad for the 2018 FIFA World Cup in Russia. In their first match at the tournament, Alfreð scored the equalising goal as Iceland drew 1–1 with Argentina.

Personal life
In 2007, Alfreð spent five months as an exchange student in Sardinia, Italy, playing for Sassari Torres during the stay, where he managed to score in a win against the Italy U-17 national team.

On 19 April 2013, Alfreð set a record for the most goals scored in a season by an Icelandic footballer playing in a top division in any country after he scored his 24th goal of the season, and also his last of the season. The previous record-holder had also played in the Netherlands, Pétur Pétursson, who scored 23 goals in 33 matches for Feyenoord in the 1979–80 Eredivisie.

Career statistics

Club

International

Scores and results list Iceland's goal tally first, score column indicates score after each Alfreð goal.

Honours
Breiðablik
 Úrvalsdeild: 2010
 Icelandic Cup: 2009

Olympiacos
Super League Greece: 2015–16

Individual
 Icelandic Premier League: Player of the Year: 2010
 Icelandic Premier League: Young Player of the Year: 2009
 Icelandic Premier League Silver Boot: 2010
 Icelandic Premier League Bronze Boot: 2009
 Icelandic Premier League Team of the Year: 2009, 2010
 Eredivisie top scorer: 2013–14 (29 goals)

References

External links
Alfreð Finnbogason at Voetbal International 

Living people
1989 births
Alfred Finnbogason
Alfred Finnbogason
Association football forwards
Alfred Finnbogason
Alfred Finnbogason
UEFA Euro 2016 players
2018 FIFA World Cup players
Alfred Finnbogason
Allsvenskan players
Belgian Pro League players
Eredivisie players
La Liga players
Super League Greece players
Bundesliga players
Danish Superliga players
S.E.F. Torres 1903 players
Alfred Finnbogason
K.S.C. Lokeren Oost-Vlaanderen players
Helsingborgs IF players
SC Heerenveen players
Real Sociedad footballers
Olympiacos F.C. players
FC Augsburg players
Lyngby Boldklub players
Alfred Finnbogason
Alfred Finnbogason
Expatriate footballers in Scotland
Alfred Finnbogason
Expatriate footballers in Italy
Alfred Finnbogason
Expatriate footballers in Belgium
Alfred Finnbogason
Expatriate footballers in Sweden
Alfred Finnbogason
Expatriate footballers in the Netherlands
Alfred Finnbogason
Expatriate footballers in Spain
Alfred Finnbogason
Expatriate footballers in Greece
Alfred Finnbogason
Expatriate footballers in Germany
Alfred Finnbogason
Expatriate men's footballers in Denmark